Snowbank Mountain refers to one of these mountain peaks:
Snowbank Mountain (Idaho) - highest summit of the West Mountains
Snowbank Mountain (Montana)

References